Pluto is a 2012 South Korean film written and directed by Shin Su-won about the severity of competition among students at an elite high school, and how far one will go to be at the top.

The film made its world premiere at the 17th Busan International Film Festival and was also screened at the 63rd Berlin International Film Festival where director Shin Su-won received a special mention in the Generation 14plus Section.

Plot
Kim Joon, a transfer student of a prestigious high school, is arrested for the murder of one of his classmates. Yoo jin, the top student of his class, was found dead in the woods behind the school and strong evidence and a group of students' testimonies point to Joon, but after some questioning with the police, he is released. Upon returning to the school, he holds the group of students as prisoners in a hidden basement. The students are members of an elite group of students, composed of the top 1% of the school who have access to certain privileges that allows them to keep their ranking high. Dark secrets of the group begin to unfold with flashbacks of how Joon, an ambitious student from an ordinary high school who was desperate to become a member, was asked to perform a series of cruel tasks in order to get in.

In the end, the study group known as 'Rabbit Hunt'()'s cruelty and crimes are exposed , and Kim Joon takes them hostage. Before that, his friend, Sujin, attempted to expose their crime to schoolmates but beaten by them to unconsciousness. While she was hospitalized, her mother discovered a letter in her hand written by Kim Joon - implying his death. At that time, Sujin sheds tear, indicating she comes back to consciousness. Meanwhile, after he turns the evidence of the study group's crime and cruel commitment as stored in USB flash memory drive over to detectives, he gives 1 minute to them to escape the room where he and hostages are in with the other one student. After they escaped, the Total Solar eclipse begins, making the room completely dark for several minutes. During the Totality phase, Joon sets the fuze of his improvised explosive device made with nitroglycerin on fire, killing himself and the study group students as well. After it ends, the total solar eclipse ends as well.

Cast
Lee David as Kim Joon
Sung Joon as Yoo-jin Taylor
Kim Kkot-bi as Jung Soo-jin
Jo Sung-ha as Chief detective Park
Kim Kwon as Han Myung-ho
Sun Joo-ah as Kang Mi-ra
Nam Tae-boo as Choi Bo-ram
Ryu Kyung-soo as Park Jung-jae
Kim Mi-jung as Eun-joo
Park Tae-sung as Literature teacher
Gil Hae-yeon as Joon's mother
Oh Jung-woo as Kang Chang-min
Hwang Jung-min  as Han Myung-ho's mother
Kim Jae-rok as Principal
 Park Hae-joon as Detective Choi

Awards and nominations

References

External links
 
 
 

2012 films
2010s Korean-language films
Sidus Pictures films
South Korean mystery thriller films
2010s South Korean films